Judy Valerie Cornwell (born 22 February 1940) is an English actress and writer best known for her role as Daisy in the successful British sitcom Keeping Up Appearances (1990–1995). She also played Anya Claus in Santa Claus: The Movie (1985). In her later years she became known for playing Miss Marple in many stage productions, including A Murder Is Announced between 2014 and 2016.

Biography
Cornwell's father served in the RAF and she grew up in Britain, where she attended a convent school, with Penelope Keith. She later attended Saint Michael Boarding school in Heacham, Norfolk, before moving to Australia with her family. She has written about her childhood experiences in her autobiography Adventures of a Jelly Baby. She later returned to Britain and became a professional dancer and comedian in her teens, working her act between the nudes at Dhurjati Chaudhury's Irving Theatre Club, on Irving Street, off Leicester Square, London., before becoming an actress. Her career includes roles in radio's The Navy Lark, the play Oh! What A Lovely War, her own TV comedy series Moody and Pegg, and several seasons with the Royal Shakespeare Company.

Films and television
Cornwell's film roles include Santa Claus: The Movie (as Anya Claus) and Mad Cows. On television she has appeared in Dixon of Dock Green, Cakes and Ale, Bergerac, Doctor Who (the serial Paradise Towers), several episodes of Farrington of the F.O., The Famous Five, The Bill, Heartbeat, The Royal, Miss Marple, Midsomer Murders and The Devil's Lieutenant. Cornwell also appeared in BBC soap opera EastEnders as Queenie Trott, the mean tyrant mother of lovable loser Heather Trott. In 1987, she appeared as the English spinster Rosemary Tuttle in the episode "Rumpole and the Official Secret" from Season 4 of Rumpole of the Bailey.

She is best known however, for her portrayal of lovable working class housewife Daisy in all 44 episodes of the sitcom Keeping Up Appearances, which ran for 5 series from 1990 to 1995.

She also appeared in the series of Birds of a Feather.

Published works
Cornwell's books include her autobiography Adventures of a Jelly Baby published in 2005 which describes her childhood growing up in Britain during the war, and then in Australia where her family emigrated.

She has also published several novels, including Cow and Cow Parsley in 1985, Fishcakes at the Ritz in 1989, The Seventh Sunrise in 1994, and Fear and Favour in 1996.

Personal life
Cornwell married John Kelsall Parry on 18 December 1960 and they have one son together. The couple reside in Brighton. There, Parry was a reporter for The Argus.

Filmography

Film

Television

References

External links

Judy Cornwell at the British Film Institute
Judy Cornwell (Aveleyman)

1940 births
Actresses from London
British autobiographers
English film actresses
English radio actresses
English stage actresses
English television actresses
English women novelists
Living people
People from Hammersmith
Royal Shakespeare Company members
English expatriates in Australia
Women autobiographers